Bailongqiao is a suburban town in Wucheng District of Jinhua, Zhejiang, China.

Administrative division
As of 2017, the town is divided into 49 villages and 7 communities.

Geography
The Baisha Stream passes through the town.

Education
 Jinhua No. 10 High School

Transportation
The Bailongqiao railway station serves the town.  Zhejiang-Jiangxi railway runs northeast to southwest through the town.

The China National Highway 330, more commonly known as "G330", is a highway passing through the town's downtown, commercial, and industrial area.

The Hangzhou-Jinhua-Quzhou Expressway travels through the town.

Attractions
Bailongqiao Covered Bridge is a famous scenic spot in the town.

References

Divisions of Wucheng District
Towns of Jinhua